Daniel "Dan" Zack (born either 1992 or 1993) is an American professional poker player from Princeton, New Jersey. He was the 2022 World Series of Poker Player of the Year, after winning two bracelets and obtaining two additional final tables. Prior to this, Zack had won a WSOP circuit ring in 2014, and a bracelet in 2019.

World Series of Poker Bracelets

External links
Hendon Mob profile
WSOP.com profile

1990s births
Living people
American poker players
World Series of Poker bracelet winners
People from Princeton, New Jersey